Mwinilunga District is a district of Zambia, located in North-Western Province. The capital lies at Mwinilunga. As of the 2000 Zambian Census, the district had a population of 117,505 people.

References

 
Districts of North-Western Province, Zambia